The 2003 World Wushu Championships was the 7th edition of the World Wushu Championships. It was held at the Indoor Stadium of the Macau Polytechnic Institute in Macau, China from November 3 to November 7, 2003. 411 athletes from 59 IWUF national federations participated in this event. This is the first edition where women's sanshou was added.

Medal summary

Medal table

Men's taolu

Men's sanda

Women's taolu

Women's sanda

References



World Wushu Championships
Wushu Championships
World Wushu Championships, 2003
2003 in wushu (sport)
Wushu competitions in Macau